The New Delhi Challenger was a professional tennis tournament played on outdoor hard courts. It was part of the Association of Tennis Professionals (ATP) Challenger Series. It was held eight times in New Delhi, in 1999, 2003, 2007 and 2008.

Past finals

Singles

Doubles

External links
ITF Search

ATP Challenger Tour
Hard court tennis tournaments
Tennis tournaments in India
Recurring sporting events established in 1999
Recurring sporting events disestablished in 2008
1999 establishments in Delhi
2008 disestablishments in India